4. Liga or 4 liga may refer to:

 4. Liga (Slovakia), fourth-highest football league in Slovakia
 4. Liga (Switzerland), regional football league in Switzerland
 IV liga, fifth-highest football league in Poland

See also
 IV liiga, football league in Estonia
 Liga IV, football league in Romania
 Liga (disambiguation)
 1. Liga (disambiguation)
 2. Liga (disambiguation)
 3. Liga (disambiguation)